Anna Stetsenko is a developmental psychologist.  She is a professor of psychology and of urban education at the City University of New York.

Education and career
Stetsenko received her doctorate in general and developmental psychology from  Moscow State University, and spent several years in research at the University of Moscow. She also conducted research at the Institute of General and Education Psychology of the Russian Academy of Education.  In Berlin, she worked as a postdoctoral research fellow at the Max Planck Institute; she was an Invited Visiting Fellow at the Center of Cultural Studies in Vienna, and Assistant Professor at the Department of Developmental Psychology, University of Bern, Switzerland.  She began work at the City University of New York in 1999.

Theories
Stetsenko has outlined a socio-cultural activity theory and its potential positive and negative outcomes within the human development and learning. She has carried out extensive empirical research on adolescents and social development, closely related to issues of gender, self-concept and motivation. Her works are closely connected with the social-cultural interaction and daily activities of adolescents and children. Stetsenko's writings have a strong emphasis on multicultural theories in developmental psychology. She has also conducted research on the works of Vygotsky, Leontiev and Alexander Luria. Stetsenko has published numerous book chapters, textbooks, and journal articles in German, English, and Russian.

See also
 Cultural-historical activity theory
 Leading activity

Notes

External links

Developmental psychologists
Russian expatriates in the United States
Russian psychologists
Russian women psychologists
Living people
Year of birth missing (living people)